= Mieroszewski Manor House in Sosnowiec =

The Mieroszewski Manor House in Sosnowiec
- Dwór Mieroszewskich w Sosnowcu
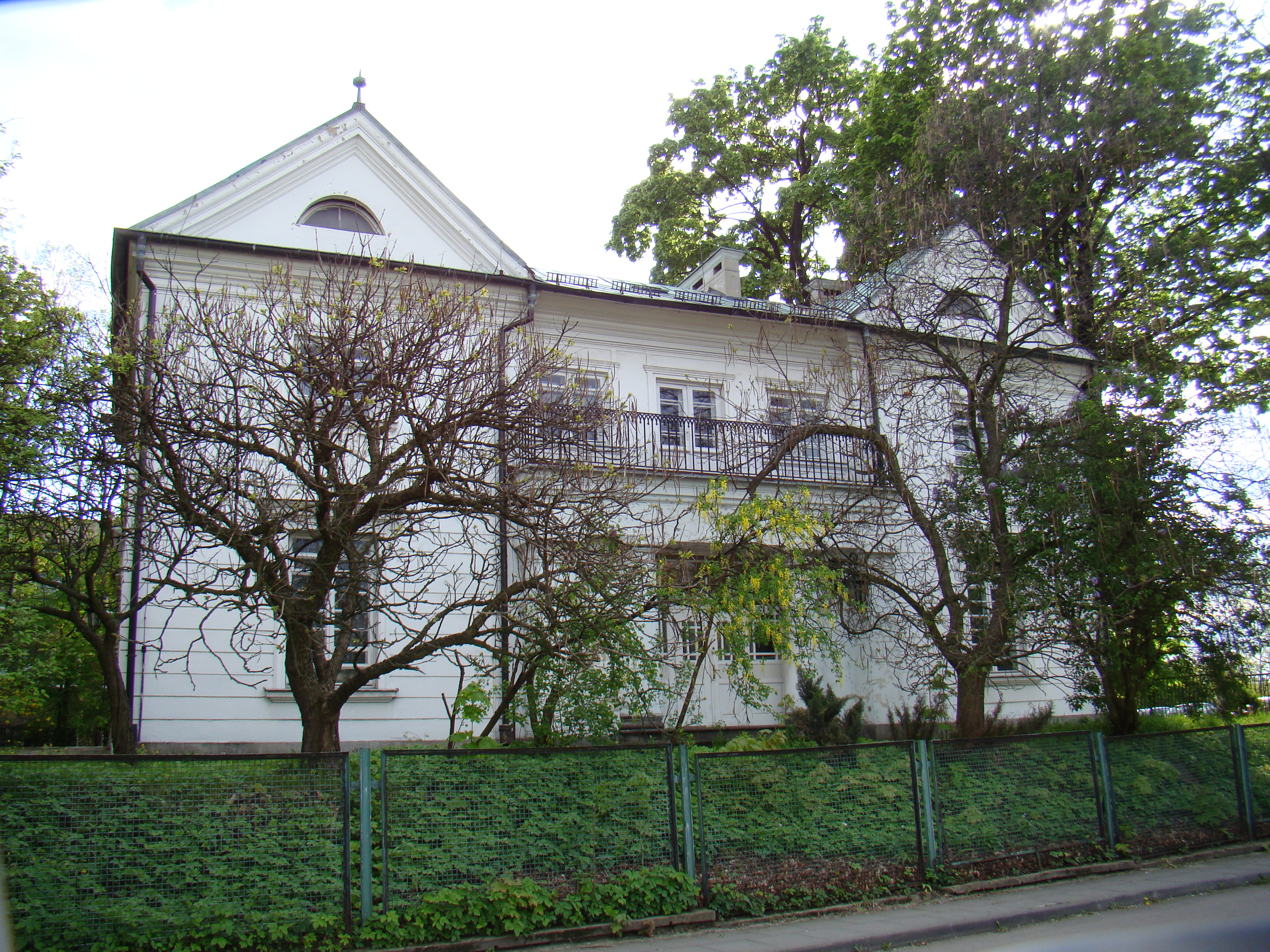

- Location within Poland

General information
- Location: Sosnowiec, Poland, Poland
- Coordinates: 50°17′54.60″N 19°10′49.69″E
- Completed: 1777

Technical details
- Floor count: 3

The Mieroszewski Manor House in Sosnowiec-Zagórze was erected in 1777 by count Józef Mieroszewski in place of a wooden larch court on the top of the Zagórze Hill. It is one of the two palaces that were located here. Preserved in the form of the remnant park formerly surrounded the court from all sides. The park is currently occupied by Hospital No. 3.

Initially it was a single-storey brick mansion covered with a beveled roof with an axle and a balcony. The construction of the structure of the building, especially the scaffolding of the roof, used beams from the dismantled wooden manor house.

During the reconstruction in 1876, the building was elevated to about one floor and the front elevation was finished with two peaks. At the beginning of the 1970s, before the site of the Conservation of Monuments was placed here, an outbuilding from the eastern side was removed, whereby the body of the palace was symmetric. Currently, this classicist building is five-axial, with a three-axial central projection. On the north (front) side, on the axis, there is a porch with a massive balcony supported by columns. The whole is covered by hip roof, passing from the north to the two peaks. Since the 1970s there is a workshop for the preservation of works of art in the manor house.
